Múzquiz metro station is a station of the Mexico City Metro in the colonia (neighborhood) of Valle de Aragón 3a. Sección, in Ecatepec de Morelos, State of Mexico, in the metropolitan area of Mexico City. It is an at-grade station with one island platform served by Line B (the Green-and-Gray Line), between Ecatepec and Río de los Remedios stations. The name of the station references the nearby colonia of Melchor Múzquiz, which in turn was named after Melchor de Eca y Múzquiz, the fifth president of Mexico; its pictogram depicts a representation of his bust. The station was opened on 30 November 2000, on the first day of service between Ciudad Azteca and Buenavista stations. The facilities are partially accessible for people with disabilities as there are tactile pavings and braille signage plates. In 2019, Múzquiz metro station had an average daily ridership of 30,812 passengers, making it the third-most used on the line.

Location

Múzquiz is a metro station along Carlos Hank González Avenue (also known as Central Avenue), in Ecatepec de Morelos, State of Mexico, a neighboring municipality of Mexico City. The station serves the colonia (Mexican Spanish for "neighborhood") of Valle de Aragón 3a. Sección. Within the system, the station lies between Ecatepec and Río de los Remedios stations.

Exits
There are four exits:
North: Carlos Hank González Avenue and Valle del Guadiana Avenue, Valle de Aragón 3a. Sección.
Northeast: Carlos Hank González Avenue and Valle del Henares Avenue, Valle de Aragón 3a. Sección.
South: Carlos Hank González Avenue and Valle del Guadiana Avenue, Valle de Aragón 3a. Sección.
Southeast: Carlos Hank González Avenue and Valle del Guadiana Avenue, Valle de Aragón 3a. Sección.

History and construction
Line B of the Mexico City Metro was built by Empresas ICA; Múzquiz metro station opened on 30 November 2000, on the first day of the Ciudad Azteca–Buenavista service. The station is partially accessible for people with disabilities as there are tactile pavings and braille signage plates. The pedestrian bridges that connect the access to the station are adapted for bicycles as a bicycle lane was built in 2015 on the adjacent median strip. The station's pictogram features the silhouette of a portrait of Melchor de Eca y Múzquiz, the fifth president of Mexico, and is named after him because of the nearby colonia of Melchor Múzquiz.

Ridership
According to the data provided by the authorities since the 2000s, commuters have averaged per year between 30,200 and 37,100 daily entrances in the last decade. In 2019, before the impact of the COVID-19 pandemic on public transport, the station had a ridership of 11,246,650 passengers, which was an increase of 42,414 passengers compared to 2018. In the same year, Múzquiz metro station was the 39th busiest station of the system's 195 stations, and it was the line's third-most used, after Buenavista and Ciudad Azteca stations.

Notes

References

External links
 

2000 establishments in Mexico
Accessible Mexico City Metro stations
Ecatepec de Morelos
Mexico City Metro Line B stations
Mexico City Metro stations outside Mexico City
Railway stations opened in 2000